Malmö Fotbollförening, commonly known as Malmö FF, Malmö, or MFF, are a women's association football team from Malmö, who compete in Division 1, the 3rd level of women's football in Sweden. Formed on 26 November 2019 and affiliated with the Scania Football Association, Malmö FF are based in Malmö, Scania.

History
On 7 September 1970 the board of Malmö FF took the decision to start a women's team as part of the main club. The team was called Malmö FF Dam – the word dam meaning lady – to distinguish the team from the men's division of the same club. In 1986 the club won the Swedish Women's Football Division 1 for the first time. The Division 1 was Sweden's highest division until 1988 when the Damallsvenskan was formed. It took three seasons for the club to win the newly formed Damallsvenskan in 1990 and more success followed in 1991, 1993 and 1994. Malmö FF Dam would then finish as runners-up for seven consecutive seasons (from 1996 to 2002). In April 2007, Malmö FF Dam started a rebranding of the team, including a new team name, jerseys, and logo. The team was renamed LdB FC Malmö on 11 April 2007. This meant that the club fully withdrew from Malmö FF and became a club of its own. That club is now known as FC Rosengård.

On 26 November 2019, an extraordinary annual members meeting of Malmö FF voted in favour of reintroducing a women's section. A merger with IF Limhamn Bunkeflo was rejected and it was decided that the new club would apply for a place at the lowest level of women's football in Sweden, Division 4 Skåne Sydvästra, for the 2020 season. Subsequently, a head coach was hired and eighteen players were recruited, many of them from levels as high as Division 1, the third level of the league system.

Current squad

Management

Organisation
As of 8 December 2020

Technical staff
As of 13 March 2023

Honours
Division 2 Södra Götaland
Winners: 2022
Division 3 Skåne Sydvästra
Winners: 2021
Division 4 Skåne Sydvästra
Winners: 2020

Footnotes

External links

  
 MFF Support  – official supporter club site
 Himmelriket  – supporter site
 MFF-Familjen  – supporter site

2019 establishments in Sweden
Association football clubs established in 2019
Women's football clubs in Sweden
Football clubs in Skåne County
Malmö FF
Sport in Malmö